Wrap, WRAP or Wrapped may refer to:

Storage and preservation
 Gift wrap or wrap paper, used to enclose a present
 Overwrap, a wrapping of items in a package or a wrapping over packages
 Plastic wrap, a thin, clear, flexible plastic used to cover food
 Shrink wrap, a polymer used to bundle boxes on a pallet for transport
 Vehicle wrap, a coloured polymer used to cover a car's paintwork, for advertising purposes or as a cost-effective alternative to a re-spray

Arts, entertainment, and media

Filmmaking
 Wrap (filmmaking), the end of filming on a movie set
 "That's a wrap!", an idiom often used by a director on a film set

Music
 wRAP (album), 2002 album from Finnish rapper Kana
 "Wrapped" (Gloria Estefan song), the lead single from Gloria Estefan's album Unwrapped
 "Wrapped" (Bruce Robison song), a Bruce Robison song; covered by Kelly Willis in 1998 and George Strait in 2006
 Spotify Wrapped, viral marketing campaign by Spotify

Radio 
 WRAP (Florida), former radio station, which was the first in Central Florida
 WRAP (Norfolk), a radio station in Norfolk, Virginia, USA

Other arts, entertainment, and media
 Gallery wrap, a method of mounting an artist's canvas onto a frame
 Line wrap and word wrap, how text is continued onto the next line
 WRAP-LD, a low-power television station airing infomercials in Cleveland, Ohio, US
 Wrapped (magazine), an alternative lifestyle magazine from Africa
 TheWrap, American news website

Marketing and finance
 Wrap account, a financial product/platform in which a brokerage manages an investor's portfolio for a flat quarterly or annual fee
 Wrap advertising, a method of advertising on vehicles
 Service wrap, a set of non-core services which are bundled with a core service

Organisations
 Waste & Resources Action Programme, a nonprofit organisation in the United Kingdom
 Worldwide Responsible Accredited Production, a not-for-profit organization in the United States

Products and services
 Wrap (clothing), a skirt-like garment
 Wrap (food), a food item where an outer shell is wrapped around another food item, often a standard sandwich filling or vegetables
 Mud wrap, a type of spa treatment

Technology
 .wrap, computer video file format
 Web Resource Authorization Protocol, an IETF draft for the OAuth protocol; see User-Managed Access
 Wireless Router Application Platform, a very small form factor personal computer
 Wire wrap, electric/electronic connections

Other uses
 Wellness Recovery Action Plan, a therapeutic method and series of self-help books

See also
 Cover (disambiguation)
 Enclose (disambiguation)
 Rap (disambiguation)
 Rapt (disambiguation)
 Wrapper (disambiguation)
 Wrapping (disambiguation)
 Wraparound (disambiguation)